Virtual reality in telerehabilitation is a method used first in the training of musculoskeletal patients using asynchronous patient data uploading, and an internet video link. Subsequently, therapists using virtual reality-based telerehabilitation prescribe exercise routines via the web which are then accessed and executed by patients through a web browser. Therapists then monitor the patient's progress via the web and modify the therapy asynchronously without real-time interaction or training.

Background
The computer technology that allows development three-dimensional virtual environments consists of both hardware and software. The current popular, technical, and scientific interest in virtual environments is inspired, in large part, by the advent and availability of increasingly powerful and affordable visually oriented, interactive, graphical display systems and techniques lacking only sense and sensibility.

The term "virtualized reality" (VR) was coined and introduced in a paper by Kanade. The traditional virtual reality world is typically constructed using simplistic, artificially created computer-aided design (CAD) models. VR starts with the real-world scene and virtualizes it. Virtual reality is a practical, affordable technology for the practice of clinical medicine, and modern, high-fidelity virtual reality systems have practical applications in areas ranging from psychiatry to surgical planning and telemedicine. Through VR's capacity to allow the creation and control of dynamic 3-dimensional, ecologically valid stimulus environments within which behavioral response can be recorded and measured, it offers clinical assessment and rehabilitation options not available with traditional methods.

Application
The value of VR systems for the investigation and rehabilitation of cognitive and perceptual impairments and current and potential applications of VR technology address six neurorehabilitation issues. Korean researchers developed and assessed the value of a new rehabilitation training system to improve postural balance control by combining virtual reality technology with an unfixed bicycle. The system was effective as a training device; in addition, the technology might have a wider applicability to the rehabilitation field.

Tracy and Lathan investigated the relationship between motor tasks and participants' spatial abilities by training participants within a VR based simulator and then observing their ability to transfer training from the simulator to the real world. The study demonstrated that subjects with lower spatial abilities achieved significant positive transfer from a simulator based training task to a similar real world robotic operation task.

Virtual environments were applied to assess the training of inexperienced powered wheelchair users and demonstrated that the two virtual environments represent a potentially useful means of assessing and training novice powered wheelchair users. A recently completed project at the University of Strathclyde has resulted in the development of a wheelchair motion platform which, in conjunction with a virtual reality facility, can be used to address issues of accessibility in the built environment.

Many cases have applied virtual reality technology to telemedicine and telerehabilitation service development. Because telemedicine focuses principally on transmitting medical information, VR has potential to enhance the practice. State of the art of VR-based telemedicine applications is used in remote or augmented surgery as well as in surgical training, both of which are critically dependent on eye–hand coordination. Recently, however, different researchers have tried to use virtual environments in medical visualization and for assessment and rehabilitation in neuropsychology.

Case studies for VR applications were conducted that were internet deliverable and they identified technical, practical, and user challenges of remote VR treatment programs. To improve understanding of deficits in autism and in left visual-spatial neglect, Trepagnier et al. investigated face gaze behavior in autism and right hemisphere stroke, using virtual reality and gaze sensing technology.

An at-home stroke telerehabilitation service was developed using virtual reality haptics. Researchers from Rutgers University and Stanford University developed a virtual reality-based orthopedic telerehabilitation system.

The use of virtual reality technologies in the rehabilitation of patients with vestibular system disorders and in the provision of remote medical consultation for those patients. He stated that an appropriately designed VR experience could greatly increase the rate of adaptation in these patients.

See also
Computationally Advanced Infrastructure Partnerships Center

References

Telerehabilitation
Virtual reality